Parisa Bakhtavar is an Iranian film and television director born on August 16, 1972 in Tehran, Iran.

Biography
She is best known for her television series Poshte Konkooriha, which followes the lives of high school seniors studying for their college entrance exams. In 2008, Bakhtavar directed Tambourine, which is her debut film that features an ensemble cast.
She is married to Iranian film director Asghar Farhadi.

Filmography

Film 
Tambourine (2008)

Television
 Auntie Sara (1992)
 Childhood Notes (2001)
 Poshte Konkooriha (2002)
 I'm A Tenant (2004)

References

External links

Iranian film directors
Living people
Iranian television directors
1972 births
People from Tehran